The men's vault was one of the eight gymnastics events on the Gymnastics at the 1896 Summer Olympics programme. The third event, it was held on 9 April. 15 athletes from five nations competed. The Germans captured the gold and bronze medals, while Zutter won the silver for Switzerland.

Background

This was the first appearance of the event, which is one of the five apparatus events held every time there were apparatus events at the Summer Olympics (no apparatus events were held in 1900, 1908, 1912, or 1920). The field consisted of 10 Germans plus five men from four other nations. The men's vault was one of only four events in 1896 that had no Greek competitors.

Competition format

The event used a "vaulting horse" aligned parallel to the gymnast's run (rather than the modern "vaulting table" in use since 2004). Each gymnast had two minutes and could perform as many vaults as he wished during that time. Judges awarded the prizes, but little is known of the scoring and rankings.

Schedule

The men's vault was held in the afternoon of the fourth day of events, following the 800 metres, team parallel bars, and team horizontal bar.

Results

References

Sources
  (Digitally available at )
  (Excerpt available at )
 

Men's vault
Men's 1896